is a motorway in Germany. It connects Suhl to Nuremberg.
The part between Bamberg and Nuremberg is also known as the Frankenschnellweg. Between exits Nürnberg/Fürth and Nürnberg-Hafen Ost it is not classified as Bundesautobahn. In Nürnberg-Gostenhof it is not an Autobahn and interrupted by crossings with traffic lights.

Exit list 

 

 
 

 

 

 

 

 

 

  

 

 

|}

External links 

073
A073
A073
Buildings and structures in Nürnberger Land